Stygobromus canadensis, the Castleguard Cave stygobromid, is a species of amphipod in the Crangonyctidae family and Stygobromus genus. It is endemic to Castleguard Cave in Alberta, Canada. It was first described by John Holsinger in 1980. It is currently listed as critically imperiled by NatureServe.

The presence of this species has led to the cave's designation as a Key Biodiversity Area.

References

External links

 Tiny creature unlocks life before the ice age - BBC News video report on S. canadensis

Endemic fauna of Canada
canadensis